Ozyablitsy is a rural locality (a village) in Moshokskoye Rural Settlement, Sudogodsky District, Vladimir Oblast, Russia. The population was 17 as of 2010.

Geography 
Ozyablitsy is located 40 km southeast of Sudogda (the district's administrative centre) by road. Posyolok imeni Vorovskogo is the nearest rural locality.

References 

Rural localities in Sudogodsky District